Michael Charles McCoy (August 16, 1953 – February 20, 2016) was an American football cornerback who played in the National Football League (NFL). He was drafted by the Green Bay Packers in the third round of the 1976 NFL Draft. He played college football at Colorado.

Professional career
McCoy was drafted by the Green Bay Packers in the third round of the 1976 NFL Draft. He played his entire career for the Packers from 1976 to 1983. During his career he started 97 of 110 games and recorded 13 career interceptions.

Death
McCoy died at the age of 62 on February 20, 2016.  He had dementia and was in a care facility the last four years of his life.

References

External links
 

1953 births
2016 deaths
American football cornerbacks
Colorado Buffaloes football players
Green Bay Packers players
People from West Memphis, Arkansas
Players of American football from Arkansas
People from Thornton, Colorado